Pastores is a town, with a population of 12,621 (2018 census), and a municipality, with a population of 17,814 (2018 census), in the Guatemalan department of Sacatepéquez.

References

Municipalities of the Sacatepéquez Department

pt:Pastores